Mandar Rao Dessai (born 18 March 1992) is an Indian professional footballer who plays as a left-back and winger for Indian Super League side Mumbai City and the India national team. Mandar holds the record for most appearances in the history of Indian Super League.

Career

Dempo
Desai made his professional debut for Dempo in the 2013-14 I-League on 22 September 2013 against Shillong Lajong at the Duler Stadium and played the match till 55th minute before he was replaced by Jeje Lalpekhlua as his team lost the match 0–3.

Goa (loan)
Mandar represented Goa in the 2014 Indian Super League, on loan from Dempo, and was a regular for his team on the left wing.

Return to Dempo
After the 2014 ISL, Mandar returned to his senior club and started the new season in the 2014-15 Indian Federation Cup, where he played in 5 of his teams' cup-winning campaign, assisting Tolgay Ozbey once in a group game. While he was regular for Dempo during the 2014-15 I-League, he could not prevent his team from getting relegated. He made 14 appearances, with only 5 starts in the league.

Goa (loan)
Mandar was retained by Goa for the 2015 Indian Super League with Zico impressed by him from the 2014 season. He started and scored in the first game of the season against Roberto Carlos lead northern outfit Delhi Dynamos from a Romeo Fernandes assist as his team won 2–0. He scored again in a round 4 game away at Guwahati against NorthEast United after coming on as a substitute, from a swift counterattack, showing his impressive pace. Mandar then turned in his first assist of the season at home against Kerala Blasters from a corner, assisting Gregory Arnolin with a goal that turned out be the winner. He won Hero of the Match awards for his performances against Delhi Dynamos and Pune City in 2015 Indian Super League. Mandar scored his 3rd goal of the season against Kerala Blasters in a 1–5 win at Kochi on 29 November 2015, where he also assisted Reinaldo for the 3rd goal.

Return to Dempo
After contractual problems, Mandar returned to play for Dempo, where he had a contract until the end of the 2015–16 season where he helped his team win promotion back to the I-League.

Goa
Desai signed a permanent deal with Goa from the 2016 Indian Super League season. He later went to Spain for a short training cum trial stint with La Liga side Villarreal CF.

Mumbai City
In 2020, Dessai moved to Mumbai City and emerged champions of the 2020–21 season. He was later included in club's 2022 AFC Champions League squad.

International
Mandar captained Goa-India during the 2014 Lusophony Games where he made 4 appearances and scored once, as he led his team to the gold medal, beating the under-20 team of Mozambique in the final.

Mandar made his India U23 debut in the 2014 Asian Games against UAE U23.

Personal life
Mandar was in a relationship with Cecilie Bjørnstrup Andersen, an amateur Danish footballer, since 2018. They have a daughter namely Aya. The couple separated in 2021.

Career statistics

International

Honours
Dempo
I-League 2nd Division: 2015–16
Goa
ISL League Winners Shield: 2019–20
Super Cup: 2019
Mumbai City
Indian Super League: 2020–21
ISL League Winners Shield: 2020–21
ISL League Winners Shield: 2022–23

India
SAFF Championship: 2021
Lusophony Games: 2014

References

External links

1992 births
Living people
People from Mapusa
Indian footballers
Dempo SC players
Footballers from Goa
I-League players
Footballers at the 2014 Asian Games
India youth international footballers
Association football wingers
Bengaluru FC players
Indian Super League players
FC Goa players
Mumbai City FC players
Asian Games competitors for India
India international footballers